Donald J. Bingle (born ) is a Chicago-area attorney and author originally from Naperville, Illinois.

Role-playing games
Bingle graduated from the University of Chicago. In the late 1980s he was the top-ranked player in the Role-Playing Network, and his wife, Linda, was ranked number two. He is best known as the top-ranked player in the RPGA for most of the 1990s. The Bingles began the company 54°40' Orphyte to publish role-playing books, including two adventures for Timemaster, and they also gave some support to the Timemaster line using RPGA tournaments.  As of the end of 2004, Bingle had played in 500 tournaments using 50 different game systems.

He has also produced a large body of writing, including contributions to the Forgotten Realms Campaign Setting (2nd Edition), and his novel Forced Conversion, which was released in November 2004 and centers around a futuristic society with the ability to upload people's minds to virtual worlds.

Bingle also authored a number of character-provided events for the RPGA, including "Don't Go There" with Saul Resiknoff, and "The Modern Pirate Game" with Tim White.

References

External links
Home page of Donald J. Bingle
 

1950s births
20th-century American male writers
20th-century American novelists
21st-century American male writers
21st-century American novelists
American male novelists
Illinois lawyers
Living people
Novelists from Illinois
Role-playing game designers
University of Chicago alumni
Writers from Naperville, Illinois